The Very Best of Herman's Hermits is the name of a greatest hits album released in the U.K. by EMI Records' budget label Music For Pleasure for Herman's Hermits in 1984.  The album's final track on Side 2, the cover version of David Bowie's "Oh You Pretty Things" is not Herman's Hermits but Peter Noone solo from 1971. EMI licensed the song for this LP from RAK Records. The cover uses the same photograph as earlier MFP compilation The Most of Herman's Hermits.

Track listing
Side 1
 "I'm into Something Good" (Gerry Goffin, Carole King) - 2:39
 "Silhouettes" (Frank Slay, Bob Crewe) - 1:59
 "Can't You Hear My Heartbeat" (Carter, Lewis) - 2:16
 "Wonderful World" (Barbara Campbell, Herb Alpert, Lou Adler, Sam Cooke) - 1:58
 "Leaning on the Lamp Post" (Gay) - 2:43
 "A Must to Avoid" (Sloan, Barri) - 1:59
 "No Milk Today" (Graham Gouldman) - 2:58
 "Years May Come, Years May Go" (Popp, Fishman) - 3:38

Side 2
 "I'm Henry the Eighth, I Am" (Murray, Weston) - 1:49
 "There's a Kind of Hush All Over the World" (Geoff Stephens, Les Reed) - 2:33
 "Dandy" (Ray Davies) - 2:03
 "Sunshine Girl" (Stephens, Carter) - 2:36
 "Something's Happening" (Fred Murray, Weston) - 3:13
 "Mrs. Brown, You've Got a Lovely Daughter" (Peacock) (Arr. by John Paul Jones) - 2:48
 "My Sentimental Friend" (Stephens, Carter) - 3:16
 "Oh You Pretty Things" (David Bowie) - 3:04

1984 greatest hits albums
Herman's Hermits albums